Bratříkovice is a municipality and village in Opava District in the Moravian-Silesian Region of the Czech Republic. It has about 200 inhabitants.

Geography
It lies in the Nízký Jeseník mountain range.

References

External links

Villages in Opava District